= German Battle =

German Battle may refer to:

- Franco-Prussian War 1870/71 that led to the establishment of the German Empire
- Siege of Yorktown, a 1781 battle in North America
